Mark Vines (born February 23, 1957, in Richmond, Virginia, United States) is an American former tennis player. He won one singles title, the Paris Indoors tournament in 1981. Vines reached a career-high singles ranking of World No. 110 in April 1982.

Tennis career
He played at Southern Methodist University and graduated in 1979. In addition to his win in Paris, Vines reached the semi-finals of the doubles in the same tournament and the third round of the 1981 US Open.

In recent years, Vines has achieved much success on the senior tour, reaching No. 3 in the M55 circuit in October 2012.

Career finals

Singles (1 title)

References

External links
 
 

American male tennis players
Southern Methodist University alumni
Sportspeople from Richmond, Virginia
Tennis people from Virginia
1957 births
Living people
SMU Mustangs men's tennis players